Harrisonville is an unincorporated community within Shelby County, Kentucky, United States. Its post office  is closed.

References

Unincorporated communities in Shelby County, Kentucky
Unincorporated communities in Kentucky